The Heraea was an ancient Greek festival in which young girls competed in a footrace.  The race was held every four years at Olympia, and probably took place around the same time as the ancient Olympic Games.

Overview 

Not much is known about the Heraea, but most of our knowledge comes from Pausanias' Description of Greece. The date that the festival began is uncertain. There is evidence for cult activity in Olympia as far back as the tenth century BC, but the earliest cultic activity at the site appears to centre around the cult of Zeus; the cult of Hera was certainly in place by about 600 BC, when the first temple of Hera at Olympia was built. It is uncertain whether the races were an original feature of the festival, or a later addition. One story in Pausanias associates the sixteen women responsible for the Heraea with the conflict between Elis and Pisa after the death of Damophon, tyrant of Pisa around 580 BC. If the festival were already established by this point, there may have been a re-organisation around this time (as there was at other Greek festivals in the late archaic period).

The only event at the Heraean Games was the stadion, which was one sixth shorter than the equivalent men's race.  Only parthenoi (unmarried young women) competed in the games.  Competitors raced in three different age categories, though it is uncertain exactly how old the competitors were.  They wore a distinctive outfit of a short chiton cut above the knees, which left the right shoulder and breast bare, and wore their hair loose.  This outfit may have derived from the exomis, a variant of the chiton worn by labourers and associated with Hephaestus.

The winners were awarded a crown of olive leaves and a portion of a cow which was sacrificed to Hera.  They were also permitted to dedicate statues inscribed with their name to Hera, though none of these statues survive.

The festival of the Heraea was presided over by a group of sixteen women, who as well as conducting the games were responsible for weaving a peplos for Hera and arranging choral dances in honour of Hippodameia and Physcoa.  Pausanias gives two stories about these sixteen women.  The first is that the Heraia was founded by Hippodamia and the first games were held to celebrate her marriage to Pelops, and she selected sixteen women to compete in the games.  The second is that to settle a dispute between Elis and Pisa, the Eleans selected a wise elderly woman from each of sixteen polites in ancient Elis to settle the dispute; these women were also given the responsibility of organising the Heraea.

The Heraean Games may have been puberty rites or pre-nuptial rituals.  Matthew Dillon argues that as there were three different age categories for competitors, the ceremonies were unlikely to be associated with marriage.  On the other hand, the races were associated with a mythological wedding, and other races between girls in ancient Greece (such as a footrace in honour of Dionysos held at Sparta, also described by Pausanias) seem to have been associated with pre-nuptial initiations.

References

Footnotes

Works cited

External links

Ancient Greek athletic festivals
Ancient Greek women
Ancient Olympia
Festivals of Hera
Panhellenic Games
Recurring sporting events established before 1750
Women's sports competitions
Women's sport in Greece
6th-century BC establishments in Greece